The 1982–83 Liga Alef season saw Beitar Haifa (champions of the North Division) and Hapoel Marmorek (champions of the South Division) win the title and promotion to Liga Artzit. Hapoel Holon also promoted after promotion play-offs.

North Division

South Division

Promotion play-offs

Maccabi Sha'arayim would have been promoted to Liga Artzit. however, shortly after their second leg victory over Maccabi Hadera, it was discovered that a resident of Rehovot (city of Maccabi Sha'arayim), attempted to bribe several players from Maccabi Hadera. as a result, Maccabi Sha'arayim were disqualified, and the promotion play-offs rearranged, between the third placed club in the South division, Hapoel Holon, and Maccabi Hadera.

Hapoel Holon promoted to Liga Artzit.

References
Hapoel Ra'anana record win 7-0 Maariv, 8.5.83, Historical Jewish Press 
Holon's victory did not salvage Maariv, 8.5.83, Historical Jewish Press 
Sha'arayim of Gad on the way to Artzit Maariv, 22.5.83, Historical Jewish Press 
Maccabi Hadera - Hapoel Holon Davar, 5.7.83, Historical Jewish Press 
Hapoel Holon returned to Artzit, defeated Maccabi Hadera 3:0 Davar, 13.7.83, Historical Jewish Press 

Liga Alef seasons
Israel
3